Orimarga is a genus of crane fly in the family Limoniidae.

Species
Subgenus Diotrepha Osten Sacken, 1878
O. acroleuca Alexander, 1964
O. arawak Alexander, 1964
O. atribasis (Alexander, 1914)
O. bifidaria Alexander, 1970
O. concinna (Williston, 1896)
O. elongata Alexander, 1943
O. flavescens Byers, 1981
O. flavicosta (Alexander, 1928)
O. fumicosta (Alexander, 1921)
O. luteipleura Alexander, 1969
O. mirabilis (Osten Sacken, 1878)
O. myersiana (Alexander, 1930)
O. omissinervis (Alexander, 1913)
O. profusa Alexander, 1946
O. quinquefusca Alexander, 1971
O. setosivena Alexander, 1971
O. subconcinna Alexander, 1940
O. subprotrusa Alexander, 1968
O. syndactyla Alexander, 1942
O. travassosi Alexander, 1943
Subgenus Orimarga Osten Sacken, 1869
O. aequivena Alexander, 1934
O. amaurospila Alexander, 1972
O. amblystyla Alexander, 1965
O. andina Alexander, 1916
O. annandalei Alexander, 1927
O. argenteopleura Alexander, 1913
O. arizonensis Coquillett, 1902
O. asignata Senior-White, 1924
O. asura Alexander, 1966
O. attenuata (Walker, 1848)
O. australis Skuse, 1890
O. bahiana Alexander, 1930
O. basalis Alexander, 1936
O. basilobata Alexander, 1934
O. biclavata Alexander, 1974
O. bifimbriata Alexander, 1974
O. borneensis Brunetti, 1911
O. brevicula Alexander, 1956
O. brevistylata Alexander, 1966
O. carnosa Alexander, 1956
O. celestia Alexander, 1972
O. chionomera Alexander, 1945
O. chionopus Alexander, 1943
O. coracina Alexander, 1976
O. cruciformis Alexander, 1930
O. cubensis Alexander, 1933
O. dampfi Alexander, 1926
O. dichroptera Alexander, 1950
O. distalis Alexander, 1936
O. distivenula Alexander, 1936
O. euryptera Alexander, 1972
O. exasperata Alexander, 1937
O. excessiva Alexander, 1926
O. farriana Alexander, 1964
O. fasciventris Edwards, 1933
O. flaviventris Edwards, 1927
O. fokiensis Alexander, 1941
O. formosicola Alexander, 1924
O. frommeri Alexander, 1970
O. fryeri Edwards, 1912
O. fulvithorax Alexander, 1955
O. funerula Alexander, 1929
O. fuscicosta Alexander, 1966
O. fuscivenosa Alexander, 1929
O. griseipennis Alexander, 1935
O. guttipennis Alexander, 1940
O. gymnoneura Alexander, 1935
O. horai Alexander, 1927
O. hypopygialis Alexander, 1935
O. inornata Skuse, 1890
O. javana de Meijere, 1913
O. joana Alexander, 1926
O. juvenilis (Zetterstedt, 1851)
O. karnyi Edwards, 1923
O. lactipennis Alexander, 1966
O. lanei Alexander, 1942
O. latissima Alexander, 1934
O. longiventris Savchenko, 1974
O. majuscula Alexander, 1940
O. mashonensis Alexander, 1959
O. melampodia Alexander, 1940
O. melanopoda Alexander, 1976
O. monilis Alexander, 1926
O. multipunctata Alexander, 1938
O. neogaudens Alexander, 1945
O. nigroapicalis Alexander, 1941
O. nimbicolor Alexander, 1970
O. niveibasis Alexander, 1956
O. niveitarsis Alexander, 1915
O. nudivena Alexander, 1934
O. omeina Alexander, 1930
O. pachyrhyncha Alexander, 1968
O. palauiana Alexander, 1940
O. pallidibasis Alexander, 1921
O. pandu Alexander, 1966
O. papuicola Alexander, 1936
O. parvipuncta Alexander, 1938
O. peregrina Brunetti, 1912
O. perextensa Alexander, 1972
O. perpallens Alexander, 1964
O. perpictula Alexander, 1930
O. pictula Edwards, 1927
O. platystyla Alexander, 1966
O. plumbeithorax Alexander, 1955
O. pruinosa Alexander, 1928
O. punctipennis Alexander, 1914
O. quadrilobata Alexander, 1932
O. relicta Alexander, 1930
O. resupina Alexander, 1966
O. risbeci Alexander, 1934
O. rubricolor Alexander, 1931
O. rubrithorax Alexander, 1975
O. sanctaeritae Alexander, 1946
O. sanguinicolour Alexander, 1956
O. sarophora Alexander, 1961
O. sarophorodes Alexander, 1979
O. saturnina Alexander, 1943
O. scabriseta Alexander, 1938
O. scotti Edwards, 1912
O. seticosta Alexander, 1930
O. setilobata Alexander, 1969
O. sherpa Alexander, 1958
O. similis Edwards, 1923
O. soluta Alexander, 1948
O. speciosa Alexander, 1953
O. spiloptera Alexander, 1948
O. stenotes Alexander, 1969
O. streptocerca Alexander, 1936
O. subbasalis Alexander, 1936
O. subcostata Alexander, 1955
O. subspeciosa Alexander, 1962
O. subtartarus Alexander, 1946
O. suspensa Alexander, 1973
O. taiwanensis Alexander, 1924
O. taprobanica Alexander, 1966
O. tartarus Alexander, 1946
O. tenuistyla Alexander, 1966
O. tinguana Alexander, 1943
O. toala Alexander, 1935
O. transversalis Alexander, 1971
O. trispinigera Alexander, 1945
O. varuna Alexander, 1966
O. virgo (Zetterstedt, 1851)
O. wetmorei Alexander, 1920
O. yakushimana Alexander, 1930
O. zionensis Alexander, 1948
Subgenus Protorimarga Alexander, 1930
O. bequaertiana (Alexander, 1930)

References

Limoniidae
Nematocera genera